Petravec is a village in Croatia.

References

Populated places in Zagreb County
Velika Gorica